The Bishop of Dunwich is an episcopal title which was first used by an Anglo-Saxons bishop between the 7th and 9th centuries and is currently used by the suffragan bishop of the Diocese of St Edmundsbury and Ipswich. The title takes its name after Dunwich in the English county of Suffolk, which has now largely been lost to the sea.

In 1934 the Church of England revived title Bishop of Dunwich as a suffragan see; the See was erected under the Suffragans Nomination Act 1888 by Order in Council on 14 August 1934. The bishop's duties are to assist the diocesan Bishop of St Edmundsbury and Ipswich in overseeing the Diocese of St Edmundsbury and Ipswich. Mike Harrison became Bishop of Dunwich from his episcopal consecration on 24 February 2016.

List of bishops

References

External links
Crockford's Clerical Directory - Listings

 
Anglican suffragan bishops in the Diocese of St Edmundsbury and Ipswich
Diocese of St Edmundsbury and Ipswich